Amy Burkhard Evans is an American actress and musical director. She has worked on Days of Our Lives, as a musical director for two episodes, in 1999 and 2007, and as an actress playing minor character Amy from 1989–1990.

Awards and nominations
Won, 1990, Outstanding Achievement in Music Direction and Composition for a Drama Series for: "Days of Our Lives" (shared with Marty Davich and Ken Corday)
Won, 1997, Outstanding Music Direction and Composition for a Drama Series for: "Days of our Lives" (shared with Ken Corday, Brent Nelson, Dominic Messinger, Cory Lerios, John D'Andrea, and Stephen Reinhardt)
Nominated, 2006, Outstanding Achievement in Music Direction and Composition for a Drama Series for: "Days of our Lives" (shared with Stephen Reinhardt, Ken Corday, and Brent Nelson)
Nominated, 2007, Outstanding Achievement in Music Direction and Composition for a Drama Series for: "Days of our Lives" (shared with Stephen Reinhardt, Ken Corday, and D. Brent Nelson)

External links

soaps.sabc1.co.za
www.soapoperadigest.com

Year of birth missing (living people)
Living people
American television actresses
Emmy Award winners
20th-century American actresses
21st-century American women